The Fairleigh Dickinson Knights men's basketball team represents Fairleigh Dickinson University in Hackensack, New Jersey, United States.  The school's team currently competes in the Northeast Conference and plays their home games at the Rothman Center. FDU is currently coached by Tobin Anderson. 

In the 2023 NCAA Division I men's basketball tournament, the Knights became only the second team seeded 16th to defeat a team seeded 1st when they beat Purdue 63–58. They also advanced past the Round of 64 for the first time in the school's history.

Postseason results

NCAA tournament results
The Knights have appeared in seven NCAA Tournaments. Their combined record is 3–7. In 2023, they defeated 1 seed Purdue as a 16 seed, becoming the second 16 seed in NCAA tournament history to win a game against a 1 seed.

NAIA Tournament results
The Knights have appeared in two NAIA Tournaments. Their record is 1–2.

NIT results
The Knights have appeared in two National Invitation Tournaments (NIT). Their combined record is 0–2.

Notable players

NBA

No Fairleigh Dickinson player has ever played in the NBA. Three former players have been selected in the NBA draft:

 Marcus Gaither, 1984 NBA draft, pick 108 by the Utah Jazz
 Ken Webb, 1981 NBA draft, pick 164 by the Detroit Pistons
 George Glasgow, 1953 NBA draft, pick 11 by the Fort Wayne Pistons

References

External links
Website